"Come Along" is a song by Swedish recording artist Titiyo. It was written by Joakim Berg and Peter Svensson for her album of the same name (2001), while production was helmed by Tore Johansson. The song was selected as the album's lead single and reached the first place in GLF and, according to Billboard, became the most played song on Sveriges Radio. The song was awarded a Swedish Grammis Award in the category Song of the Year and a Rockbjörnen Award for Swedish Song of the Year.

The song was included in the soundtrack for the 2004 film Iron Jawed Angels and was covered by Vicci Martinez. The official music video was made available on YouTube channel of Diesel Music, owner of label Superstudio Blå on 8 December 2011.

Reception
Dave Thompson from AllMusic wrote, that the song "sets the scene, a sultry post-blues number infused with just enough of Titiyo's trademark dance sensibility to mask (but never bury) the distinctly PJ Harvey-esque feel of the song itself". Mila Kravchuk from Ukrainian music website @music noted: "We fell in love with this sluggish blues melody, stretching like a molasses, with equal, rhythmic stresses. [...] It's as if this tune was brought from the old gramophone record by Robert Johnson".

Charts

Weekly charts

Year-end charts

References

External links
 Titiyo.com — official site

Titiyo songs
2001 songs
2001 singles
Songs written by Joakim Berg
Songs written by Peter Svensson
Number-one singles in Poland